The Brandywine Museum of Art is a museum of regional and American art located on U.S. Route 1 in Chadds Ford, Pennsylvania on the banks of the Brandywine Creek. The museum showcases the work of Andrew Wyeth, a major American realist painter, and his family: his father N.C. Wyeth, illustrator of many children's classics; his sister Ann Wyeth McCoy, a composer and painter; and his son Jamie Wyeth, a contemporary American realist painter.

History 
The museum is a program of the Brandywine Conservancy & Museum of Art. It opened in 1971 through the efforts of "Frolic" Weymouth, who also served on its board.

In September 2021, the museum's lower level was flooded due to the remnants of Hurricane Ida with mechanical systems, lecture rooms, classrooms and office spaces damaged and estimates around $6 million. The museum still opened for the holiday season in limited capacity later in the year.

Location 
The museum, sometimes referred to as the Wyeth Museum, is housed in a converted nineteenth-century mill overlooking the banks of the Brandywine Creek. The glass-wall lobby overlooks the river and countryside that inspired the Brandywine School earlier in the early 20th century.

Contents 
The museum's permanent collection features American illustration, still life works, and landscape painting by Jasper Francis Cropsey, Harvey Dunn, Peter Hurd, Maxfield Parrish, Howard Pyle, William Trost Richards, Barclay Rubincam, and Jessie Willcox Smith. The museum has also put on a critter ornament display and sale since 1971, with animal ornaments created with only natural materials; some were displayed at the White House in 1984.

See also
 List of single-artist museums
 Christian C. Sanderson Museum
 Farnsworth Art Museum

References

External links

 Brandywine Museum of Art

Art museums and galleries in Pennsylvania
Museums in Delaware County, Pennsylvania
Wyeth family
Brandywine Museums & Gardens Alliance
Art museums established in 1971
Institutions accredited by the American Alliance of Museums
Museums of American art
1971 establishments in Pennsylvania
Andrew Wyeth
Chadds Ford Township, Delaware County, Pennsylvania